Paria thoracica is a species of leaf beetle. It is found in North America.

References

Further reading
 American Beetles, Volume II: Polyphaga: Scarabaeoidea through Curculionoidea, Arnett, R.H. Jr., M. C. Thomas, P. E. Skelley and J. H. Frank. (eds.). 2002. CRC Press LLC, Boca Raton, FL.
 American Insects: A Handbook of the Insects of America North of Mexico, Ross H. Arnett. 2000. CRC Press.
 Peterson Field Guides: Beetles, Richard E. White. 1983. Houghton Mifflin Company.
 Riley, Edward G., Shawn M. Clark, and Terry N. Seeno (2003). Catalog of the leaf beetles of America north of Mexico (Coleoptera: Megalopodidae, Orsodacnidae and Chrysomelidae, excluding Bruchinae). Coleopterists Society Special Publication no. 1, 290.

External links
NCBI Taxonomy Browser, Paria thoracica

Eumolpinae
Beetles described in 1847
Taxa named by Frederick Ernst Melsheimer
Beetles of North America